Kings is an unincorporated community in Ogle County, Illinois, United States, and is located northwest of Rochelle.

Demographics

References

External links

NACo

Unincorporated communities in Ogle County, Illinois
Unincorporated communities in Illinois